Kannaki Amman (IAST: , ,  kaṇṇaki bhagavati) is the deified form of Kannagi, the heroine of the Tamil epic Cilappatikāram. She is worshipped in parts of Sri Lanka, Tamil Nadu, and Kerala. As a goddess of chastity, she is venerated by Indian Tamils and Malayalis, Sri Lankan Tamil Shaivites, and also by the Sinhalese Buddhists as Pattini Deviyo. In regional Hindu tradition, her tale is interpreted as the story of Durga demanding justice after the death of her husband, Kovalan, who is identified as a form of Shiva.

Origin 

Cilappatikāram, the literary work of Ilango Adigal, describes the poor life of Kannaki with her husband merchant Kovalan, who lost all his wealth during his life with a lavish courtesan dancer called Madhavi, and travelled to Madurai to start a new life. While Kovalan sold the anklets of Kannaki for money in Madurai, he was misidentified as the thief of the Pandya queen's anklet and beheaded by the king's order without any inquiries. Kannaki became furious, and advocates at the court of the king and by breaking the anklets, proving that the anklet seized from Kovalan is hers. The Pandya king dies of shock, while Kannaki took an oath to express her chastity by burning the city of Madurai. She wanders towards the west and at Neduvel Kunram, she is regarded to have become a goddess.

Veneration

Tamil Nadu 
Cilappatikāram, and its sequel, Manimekalai, offer evidence that Kannaki was praised as a goddess even during the lifetime of Manimekalai, the daughter of Kovalan and Madhavi. Cilappatikāram tells about the Kannaki worship of another Pandyan King "Vetrivel Cheliyan", for relieving the land from the drought and curse of her on Pandya Nadu.

Kannaki Amman's worship involves her identification with the Dravidian folk religion's rain goddess, Mariamman. Cilappatikāram states that Mariamman is none other than Kannaki by stating that Kannaki burnt Madurai on the Friday of the Ādi month. which is identified as the month of Mariamman's veneration in Tamil Nadu.

However, several temples like those Vattapparai Amman at Thiruvottiyur still commemorate the goddess as Kannaki Amman. Siruvachur Mathura Kaliyamman temple and the Mangala Devi Kovil in Idukki District are the other few temples where their connection with Kannaki still remembered.

Kerala 
The Kannaki cult, perhaps initiated by the rulers of Chera lineage in Kerala, is still preserved in the form of Bhagavati cult. The famous Bhagavati Temple at Kodungallur, which was the former capital of Cheras, remembers its ancient interaction with the Kannaki cult in its Sthala Puranam. Though the deity of the temple is still observed as Bhadra Kali, she is often praised by the devotees as Kannaki and Muthumari in Kodungallur.

Attukal Bhagavati Temple, Moothanthara Karnaki Amman Temple and so many Bhagavathy temples are believed to be located on the journey of Kannaki to Chera Nadu after the burning of Madurai.

Sri Lanka

Tamils 
Sri Lankan beliefs on Kannaki are intermediate to Cilappatikāram and common Sri Lankan Beliefs. Eastern Sri Lankan and Vanni Tamils praises her as "Kannakai Amman". There are so many evidences in Yalpana Vaipava Malai, chronicle of Jaffna Kingdom confirms that Kannaki cult was also popular in the period of Arya Chakravarthis (1215–1624) in Northern Sri Lanka. The author of Sri Lankan epic on Kannaki equivalent to Cilappatikāram, Kannaki Vaḻakkurai recited in Eastern Kannaki Amman temples, is believed to be written by one of the Aryachakravartis Jeyaveeran (1380 – 1410CE).

The Kannagi cult was especially popular among the coastal folk who consider her as their guardian deity since she was the daughter of a rich sea-trader of Kaveripattinam. Since most of the coastal folk were converted to Catholicism during the Portuguese rule, most of the Kannaki shrines became churches of Our Lady. The remaining temples of Kannaki were transformed into Agamic Raja Rajeshwari and Bhuvaneshvari Temples as Kannaki was considered as a ln incarnation of Shakti by the activists of Saiva movement of 19th Century in Jaffna in the leadership of Navalar.

Kannaki is mainly praised once in a year during the Vaikasi month (May–June) of Tamil Calendar in Batticaloa and Ampara Districts. The Festival is called as "Cadangu", "Kathavu Thiraththal" and so on. Kalyanak Kāl Naduthal (Planting Wedding Pillar), Vaḻakkurai Pāduthal (Reciting the verses of "Kannaki Vaḻkkurai"), Kulirthi Paaduthal ("Singing Cooling verses") are the common rituals observed in these days. The festival days are differing temple to temple from three days to seven days. In the end of Festival the sanctum of Kannaki temple is closed and it will be only opened before starting next year "Cadangu".

Sinhalese 

Although the hierophant of Kannaki is fully transformed into Bhagavathy Cult and Mariamman Cult at Kerala and Tamil Nadu respectively, Sri Lanka Still preserves the Kannaki Cult in its own form. Sinhalese praises her as "Pattini Deviyo" (The chast one goddess). Their folks on that goddess also differ from Cilappatikāram and see her as an avatar of Bodhisattva. She was born as a mango in the garden of Pandi King and neglected by him and kept in a boat to sea and grows up at Choli country and at last, she fulfilled her purpose - killing the evil Pandi King and hired as one of the guardian gods of Lanka by Buddha.

The grant Festival of Sri Lanka - "Kandy Perahera" was initially started for hailing only the Hindu gods Kannaki, Vishnu, Kataragama along with Natha. The holy tooth relic of Buddha was annexed in the procession during the period of Kirti Sri Rajasinha of Kandy Kingdom. (1747 - 1782) according to the request of Upali Thera, a Burmese Buddhist monk.

"Polkeliya"(Coconut fight),"Gammaduwa"(village rituals) and "Ankeliya" (horn play) are the main three aspects of the Sinhalese Buddhist Pattini cult. There are well known Devales are at Kandy, Nawagamuwa and Panama for Pattini Deviyo.

See also
 Kannagi
 Pattini
 Kodungallur Bhagavathy Temple
 Thambiluvil Sri Kannaki amman temple

References

External links
 All about Kannaki and Pattini

Tamil deities